The American city of Boston, Massachusetts, is home to many arts organizations in many disciplines. They include:

 ArtsBoston
 The Art Institute of Boston
 Artists For Humanity
 Blue Heron Renaissance Choir
 Boston Arts Academy
 Boston Ballet
 Boston Baroque
 Boston Center for the Arts
 Boston Children's Chorus
 Boston Children's Museum
Boston Crusaders
 Boston Cyberarts Festival
 Boston Early Music Festival
 Boston Gay Men's Chorus
 Boston Landmarks Orchestra
 Boston Lyric Opera
 Boston Modern Orchestra Project
 Boston Musica Viva
 Boston Philharmonic
 Boston Symphony Orchestra
 Celebrity Series of Boston
 Boch Center
 Commonwealth Shakespeare Company
 Coro Allegro
 New England Philharmonic
 First Act Guitar Studio
 First Night Boston
Fort Point Arts Community
 Grubb Street
 Handel and Haydn Society
 Huntington Theatre Company
 Institute of Contemporary Art
 Isabella Stewart Gardner Museum
 JazzBoston
 Museum of Fine Arts, Boston
 Odyssey Opera
 Opera Boston
 Pro Arte Chamber Orchestra
 StageSource
 The Publick Theatre
 The Society of Arts and Crafts
 Wheelock Family Theatre

See also

 Culture of Boston

Arts organizations

Boston